Ruán Magan (born 1968) is an Irish director, producer, writer and creator whose work in drama, documentary, theatre and major stadium events has been recognised with over 40 international industry awards and has reached audiences of millions around the world.

Projects include Dunhuang – Mysteries of the Sands (IFA/Tencent), Pearl Harbor – The Heroes Who Fought Back (Discovery), 1916 – The Irish Rebellion (RTE, APT), The World Meeting of Families Concert hosted for Pope Francis and The Men Who Built America (History Channel).

Early life 
Born in Dublin, Magan was raised in a traditionally nationalist family closely associated with the foundation of the Irish State, as the grandson of Sighle Humphreys and great-grandnephew of The O'Rahilly. As a boy, he was educated at Gonzaga College. He then studied History of Art and Archaeology in University College Dublin (1988–89) but did not complete his degree. He began his career in the film business, working as an assistant director and location manager on Far and Away, 3 Joes, The Devil's Own, Bogwoman and Michael Collins.

Career

Television 
Magan directed and filmed his first documentary in 1996 featuring his brother, the writer Manchán Magan, beginning a long collaboration during which the brothers made over 60 documentaries filmed across the planet. The series covered themes of human history, philosophy, progress and life and compared the human experience of cultures and people the world over. The brothers received the golden award for services to the Irish language from the Directors Guild for their work.

He produced work in the United States including the Emmy-winning series The Men Who Built America, telling the story of Vanderbilt, Canergie and their fellow "robber-barons," Pearl Harbor - The Heroes Who Fought Back, Sacred Sites, a series exploring the mysteries of the ancient world and The Ghosts of Duffy’s Cut, a film that examines the mysterious deaths of 57 railway workers in the 1850s. In 2003, he filmed the story of Riverdance's first performance in China's Great Hall of the People.

As producer and editor, Magan has collaborated widely including with human rights activist, Deeyah Khan, as she worked for seven years producing her documentary film, Banaz - A Love Story and with Mark McLoughlin in the making of Blood Rising and Outsider.

He created documentary projects exploring Irish history. Among these, On God's Mission, Lifers and The Nazarene  examine the experience and effects of Irish missionaries and NGOs in Africa, South America, and Asia. He directed the drama-documentaries Waterloo's Warriors and Death or Canada which explore the participation of Irish soldiers in the Battle of Waterloo and the experience of migrants fleeing the famine for Canada during the Great Famine 1847. He collaborated with broadcaster Gay Byrne making two documentaries, My Father’s War revealing the terrible experiences of Irish soldiers during World War I and Last Orders, which charts the rise and fall of the Irish Christian Brothers and the effects of child abuse scandals in Ireland.

Magan has written and directed two documentary series and feature-length documentaries examining Ireland's struggle for independence from 1913 to 1923. Both 1916 – The Irish Rebellion and The Irish Revolution. 1916 – The Irish Rebellion reached audiences of over 40 million people around the world.

Magan wrote, produced and directed the acclaimed and multi-award-winning documentary feature, The Hunger, narrated by Liam Neeson, and produced in collaboration with University College Cork. It tells the heartrending story of the great famine of the 1840s, which caused the deaths of 100,000 people in Europe and over a million people in Ireland and the emigration of 2 million people to the US, Canada, Britain and Australia between 1845 and 1855. The Hunger has aired coast to coast in America on PBS, in Ireland on RTÉ, across Europe on ARTE and in China on XiGua.

Steps of Freedom, a major dance and entertainment documentary film, released in 2021, tells the extraordinary story of how Irish dance rose from being the traditional dance of the people to become a global phenomenon that has reached audiences across the world.

Drama 
In 2019, Magan collaborated with Tencent and IFA Media Beijing as writer and director of Dunhuang - Edge of the World, a 5 part series that tells the 1000-year history of the Silk Road frontier post, Dunhuang. Nominated for the Asian Academy Awards and featuring an all star cast, the series reached audiences of 50 million per episode on Tencent.

Magan directed the pilot episode for the long-running true crime investigation Discovery series Redrum. The series avoids traditional mystery programming by starting the stories at the scene of the crimes and working backward to reveal the killers.

In 2016, Magan directed the award-winning comedy-drama series, Wrecking the Rising, starring Peter Coonan and Eoin McDonnell. This irreverent comedy series charting the adventures of feckless time-travelling amateur historians has been selected by the Irish Department of Education to be part of the Irish secondary school curriculum.

Magan directed the Irish-language film, Éoinín na nÉan (2015) and the multi-award-winning short film, Angel. He has written several screenplays including The Noticer (2015), No Fury (2019) and, with writer Mark Doherty, The Trouble with Charlie (2019).

Magan is set to produce Devil In The Feet, a cinema-documentary revealing the origins of Irish dance, due for international release in 2021.

Theatre and stadium events  
Collaborating with Professor Chris Fitzpatrick, Magan wrote and directed the experimental play, And Spring Shall Come.

In 2018, Magan was Creative Director of the World Meeting of Families, a music, song, and dance show held in Croke Park in Dublin to celebrate the visit of Pope Francis to Ireland featuring Andrea Bocelli, Shaun Davey, and a choir of a thousand. The event featured 1,500 performers and played to a record-breaking full house and television audiences around the world.

He fulfilled a similar role, as Creative Director of the Gaelic Athletic Association's 1916 Commemoration show, Laochra.

In recent years, he has made a series of short films in collaboration with Irish state bodies and the Department of the Taoiseach. They include This Is Ireland], [https://www.facebook.com/manstuff/videos/ireland-here-we-live/1911218482245922/ Here We Live], and [https://www.youtube.com/watch?v=8tPL6RjghGs Ireland’s campaign video for a UN Security Council seat.

Selected awards and honours

 Delhi International Film Festival (2020) for The Irish Revolution
 Prix Europa (2019) for The Irish Revolution 
 Accolade Award (2018) for Sacred Sites 
 Programming Excellence Award, American Public TV (2016) for 1916 – The Irish Rebellion
 Silver Sabre, World Military Film Festival (2016) for 1916 – The Irish Rebellion
 Irish Film and Television Academy Award (2016) for 1916 – The Irish Rebellion 
 New York Film festival, Gold Award, World Media Festival (2015) for Waterloo’s Warriors
 World Religious Film Festival (2014) for Lifers
 Radharc Award (2014) for Lifers
 Outstanding Contribution Award from the Screen Directors Guild of Ireland (2013)
 Emmy Nomination Best Documentary (2013) for The Men Who Built America 
 Irish Film and Television Academy Award (2013) for The Radharc Squad
 Milan International Film Festival (2013) for Angel 
 Best Drama, Fastnet Film Festival (2012) for Angel
 Overall Winner, Fastnet Film Festival (2012) for Angel
 Gemini Awards (2010) for Death or Canada
 Irish Film and Television Academy Award (2007) for The Pope's Children

See also
Manchán Magan

References

External links
Official website

Screen Directors Guild Ireland

1968 births
20th-century Irish people
21st-century Irish people
Living people
Irish documentary filmmakers
Irish documentary film directors
Irish film directors
People educated at Gonzaga College
Alumni of University College Dublin
Theatre people from Dublin (city)
Film people from Dublin (city)